Helsingborgs SS is a Swedish swim team founded in 1907. The club's activities take place in Filbornabadet and Simhallsbadet. The most famous swimmers are Therese Alshammar, Helena Åberg, Johanna Sjöberg and Emma Igelström, who have all competed in the Summer Olympics.

Swimmers 
 Therese Alshammar (1996)
 Emma Igelström
Louise Karlsson
Johanna Sjöberg
 Helena Åberg

Coaches 
Hans Chrunak

External links 
Helsingborgs SS's official homepage (In Swedish)

Sport in Skåne County
Sports clubs established in 1907
Swimming clubs in Sweden